Ezra Abbot (April 28, 1819, Jackson, MaineMarch 21, 1884, Cambridge, Massachusetts) was an American biblical scholar.

Life and writings
Abbot was born at Jackson, Maine, April 28, 1819; son of Ezra and Phebe Abbot. He was educated at Phillips Exeter Academy and graduated from Bowdoin College in 1840. In 1847, at the request of Prof. Andrews Norton, he went to Cambridge, Massachusetts where he was principal of a public school until 1856. He was assistant librarian of Harvard University from 1856 to 1872, and planned and perfected an alphabetical card catalog, combining many of the advantages of the ordinary dictionary catalogs with the grouping of the minor topics under more general heads, which is characteristic of a systematic catalogue. From 1872 until his death he was Bussey Professor of New Testament Criticism and Interpretation in the Harvard Divinity School.

Abbot's studies were chiefly in Southwest Asian languages and textual criticism of the New Testament, though his work as a bibliographer showed such results as the exhaustive list of writings (5300 in all) on the doctrine of the future life, appended to W. R. Alger's History of the Doctrine of a Future Life, as it has prevailed in all Nations and Ages (1862), and published separately in 1864.

Abbot's publications, though always of the most thorough and scholarly character, were to a large extent dispersed in the pages of reviews, dictionaries, concordances, texts edited by others, Unitarian controversial treatises, etc. However, he took a more conspicuous and personal part in the preparation (with Baptist scholar Horatio Balch Hackett) of the enlarged American edition of Dr. (afterwards Sir) William Smith's Dictionary of the Bible (1867–1870), to which he contributed more than 400 articles, as well as greatly improving the bibliographical completeness of the work. He was an efficient member of the American revision committee for the Revised Version (1881–1885) of the King James Bible, and helped prepare Caspar René Gregory's Prolegomena to the revised Greek New Testament of Constantin von Tischendorf.

He was one of the 32 founding members of the Society of Biblical Literature in 1880.

His principal single work, representing his scholarly method and conservative conclusions, was The Authorship of the Fourth Gospel: External Evidences (1880; 2nd ed. by J. H. Thayer, with other essays, 1889), originally a lecture. In spite of the compression due to its form, this work was up to that time probably the ablest defense, based on external evidence, of the Johannine authorship, and certainly the most complete treatment of the relation of Justin Martyr to this gospel.

Honors
Abbot was elected a Fellow of the American Academy of Arts and Sciences in 1861. Though a layman, he received the degree of S.T.D. from Harvard in 1872, and that of D.D. from Edinburgh in 1884.

Works

Books
  - revised by Ezra Abbot

Journal articles

References

Attribution
 Endnote:
See S. J. Barrows, Ezra Abbot (Cambridge, Mass., 1884).

External links

 The historical records of Ezra Abbot are in the Harvard Divinity School Library at Harvard Divinity School in Cambridge, Massachusetts.

1819 births
1884 deaths
19th-century biblical scholars
American religion academics
American religious writers
Bowdoin College alumni
Harvard Divinity School faculty
Harvard University staff
People from Waldo County, Maine
Writers from Cambridge, Massachusetts
Fellows of the American Academy of Arts and Sciences
American biblical scholars
New Testament scholars
Translators of the Bible into English
19th-century translators
Harvard University librarians
Phillips Exeter Academy alumni